Ynet (stylized as ynet) is one of the major Israeli news and general-content websites, and is the online outlet for the Yedioth Ahronot newspaper. However, most of Ynet's content is original work, published exclusively on the website and written by an independent staff.

History

Ynet was launched in June 2000 in Hebrew only; and in 2004 launched its online English edition Ynetnews. In addition, Ynet hosts the online version of Yedioth Aharanot's media group magazines: Laisha (which also operates Ynet's fashion section), Pnai Plus, Blazer, GO magazine, and Mentha. For two years, Ynet had also an Arabic version, which ceased to operate in May 2005. Ynet's main competition comes from Walla! Mako and Nana. Since 2008, Ynet is Israel's most popular internet portal, as measured by Google Trends.

In celebration of Israel's independence day in 2005, Ynet conducted a poll to determine whom Ynet readers consider to be the greatest Israelis of all time. The top 200 results were published, with Yitzhak Rabin placing first in the survey, and David Ben-Gurion placing second. Due to the nature of the poll used to select and rank the Israelis, the results do not pretend to be an objective assessment.

Ynetnews 

Ynetnews is the online English-language Israeli news website of Yedioth Ahronoth, and the Hebrew news portal, Ynet.

Ynetnews was established in 2005 in Tel Aviv to provide reporting and news from Israel and the Middle East to the Israeli community and its readers.

The founding editor of Ynetnews, Alan Abbey, left in the summer of 2005 to serve as Internet Director for Shalom Hartman Institute in Jerusalem. The current managing editor, Sara Miller, has previously headed the websites of Haaretz English edition and The Jerusalem Post. 

Ynetnews translators and editors provide coverage of news from Israel, Jewish World and the Middle East, based on the reporting and writing from Ynet, Yedioth Ahronoth, and other publications of its parent, the Yedioth Group. It regularly features renowned Yedioth commentators such as Nahum Barnea, Ron Ben-Yishai, Eitan Haber, Smadar Perry, Ronen Bergman, Shimon Shiffer, and Ariana Melamed. It also produces original content and in-depth reporting, commentary, and analysis.

See also 
Media of Israel

References

External links
 Israel News - Ynet, 
 Israel News - Ynetnews, The English-language version of Ynet

Yedioth Ahronoth
Mass media in Tel Aviv
Israeli news websites
Israeli brands
Internet properties established in 2000
Hebrew-language websites